The 128th Mountain Assault Brigade is a formation of the Ukrainian Ground Forces.

The full title of the brigade is 128th Separate  Mountain Zakarpattia Brigade,. It is the second oldest serving formation of the UGF, being raised in 1922. It participated in the invasions of Hungary and Czechoslovakia by Soviet troops.

History 
The 128th Mechanized Division was first formed within the then USSR's Red Army as the 1st Turkmenistan Rifle Division on 12 July 1922 in the city of Poltoratsk (now Ashgabat, Turkmenistan). (Other sources give the original name as the 1st Turkmenistan Mountain Division). It was a Turkmen national formation. Serhiy Tumoshkov became the division's first commander. The division was renamed 83rd Mountain Rifle Division on 1 July 1935. On 22 June 1941 the 83rd Mountain Rifle Division was part of the 58th Rifle Corps, Central Asia Military District. Between 1 September and 1 October 1941, the division was assigned to the 53rd Army, still located within the Central Asia Military District. By January 1942 the division, still with 58th Rifle Corps, had been dispatched to Iran as part of the Anglo-Soviet invasion of Iran.

From 1 January 1943 the division fought near the area of Krasnodar where it was assigned to the 56th Army. After successfully liberating the region of Kuban and the Taman Peninsula, the division was awarded the Guards designation on 8 October 1943 and renamed the 128th Guards Turkmenistan Rifle Division.

On 24 April 1944, for participation in the battles for Crimea, the division was awarded its first Order of the Red Banner. During the month of August, the division participated in battles for the Carpathian Mountains. The division captured Northeast Hungary, what later became Zakarpattya in the Soviet Union, and on 12 October 1944 crossed the border with Czechoslovakia. Units of the division occupied Ostrava, Olomouc and other cities.

Postwar, the division was stationed in Mukacheve and became part of the 38th Army. During October and November 1956, it took part in Operation Whirlwind, the crushing of the Hungarian Revolution of 1956. The division captured Debrecen and Szolnok and Jászberény. Advancing westward, it participated in the storming of Budapest. On 15 December 1956, the division became the 128th Guards Motor Rifle Division at Esztergom. In July 1958, the division was moved back to Mukacheve. In 1968, the division participated in Operation Danube, the Soviet invasion of Czechoslovakia. During the operation, eleven soldiers of the division were killed. In May 1976, it was given the title "named for Marshal of the Soviet Union Andriy Hrechko". In December 1979, its 149th Guards Motor Rifle Regiment was transferred to the 201st Motor Rifle Division and replaced by the newly activated 487th Motor Rifle Regiment. On 8 May 1985 the division was awarded its second Order of the Red Banner in honour of the 40th anniversary of Victory Day. In January 1992, the division was taken over by Ukraine.

On 31 December 1992, in Decree 642/92, the President of Ukraine promoted the commander of the 128th Guards Motor Rifle Division of the Carpathian Military District, Colonel Vyacheslav Zabolotny, to Major-General.

In accordance with a decree of 23 August 1998, Colonel Oleksandr Maslenchuk – commander of the 128th Mechanised Division of the 38th Army Corps of the Operational Command West; was promoted to major-general.

On 27 May 2000 the Minister of Defense, General of the Army Oleksandr Kuzmuk presented the division with its Battle Banner, and read the Order of the President of Ukraine awarding the division the honourable name "Zakarpattia".

In 2002, the division was under the 38th Army Corps. After the 38th Army Corps was disbanded, the division became part of the 13th Corps.

On 18 June 2004 the 128th Guards Motor Rifle Division was reorganized into a brigade by the order of the Minister of Defense.

In 2013, the brigade became the 128th Mountain Brigade.

In 2014–15 the brigade fought in the War in Donbas, taking part in the Battle of Debaltseve. For his leadership in the Battle of Debaltseve, brigade commander Colonel Serhiy Shaptala was awarded the title Hero of Ukraine.

The brigade has a training ground near the city of Vynohradiv.

On 18 November 2015, the brigade's honorifics "Turkestan twice Red Banner" were removed as part of an Armed Forces-wide removal of Soviet awards and honorifics. The "Zakarpattia" battle honour, awarded for the liberation of the area in 1945, remained. On 22 August 2016, its Guards title was also removed.

In April 2022, the brigade took part in the defence of Ukraine during the 2022 Russian invasion of Ukraine, fighting in the Luhansk region, soldiers of the brigade reportedly took part in the Battle of Kreminna, suffering some losses.

The brigade took part in the 2022 Ukrainian southern counteroffensive. In the brigade's native Zakarpattia Oblast on 2 September 2022, a day of mourning was held after the deaths of seven residents of the region who served in the brigade. During  the southern counteroffensive, the brigade (re)captured Myrolyubivka on 3 October 2022, followed by liberating a string of villages on the right bank of the Dnieper River.

On 18 February 2023 President Volodymyr Zelenskyy stated that the brigade was operating and fighting in Zaporizhzhia Oblast.

Current structure 

As of 2018, the brigade's structure is as follows:

 128th Mountain Brigade, Mukachevo
 Headquarters & Headquarters Company, Mukachevo
 15th Mountain Infantry Battalion, Uzhhorod
 21st Mechanized Battalion, Mukachevo
 36th Mechanized Battalion, Mukachevo
 16th Tank Battalion, Uzhhorod
 17th Brigade Artillery Group
 Headquarters & Target Acquisition Battery
 Self-propelled Artillery Battalion (2S3 Akatsiya)
 Self-propelled Artillery Battalion (2S1 Gvozdika)
 Rocket Artillery Battalion (BM-21 Grad)
 Anti-tank Artillery Battalion (MT-12 Rapira)
 10th Anti-Aircraft Missile Artillery Battalion, Mukachevo
 534th Engineer Battalion
 Maintenance Battalion
 Logistic Battalion
 Reconnaissance Company
 Sniper Company
 Electronic Warfare Company
 Signal Company
 Radar Company
 CBRN-defense Company
 Medical Company
 Brigade Band

Division order of battle 
  Divisional Command and Staff, Uzhhorod
  315th Mechanized Regiment, Berehove
  327th Mechanized Regiment, Uzhhorod
  820th Mechanized Regiment, Mukachevo
  398th Armor Regiment Uzhorod, Uzhhorod
  331st Self-Propelled Artillery Regiment, Perechyn
 757th Anti-Tank Artillery Battalion, Svaliava
 253rd Anti-Aircraft Missile Regiment, Svaliava
  47th Separate Reconnaissance Battalion

The 327th Mechanized Regiment was reorganized to form the 15th Mountain Infantry Battalion, which became the first Mountain Infantry formation in the current Ukrainian Ground Forces.

Former commanders
Colonel Viacheslav Zabolotnyi – 1992 - 1993
Major General Henadiy Vorobyov – 2001 - 2002
Colonel Serhiy Horoshnikov – 2002 – 2003
Vasyl Koka – 2004
Colonel Viktor Hanushchak – 2007 –
Colonel Serhiy Shaptala – 2014 – 2017
Lieutenant Colonel Serhiy Sobko – 2017 – 2019
Serhiy Tumoshkov – 12 July 1922 –

Awards
8 October 1943, received the honourable designation "Guards" for liberating the region of Kuban and the Taman Peninsula.
24 April 1944, received the Order of the Red Banner for participating in the Liberation of Crimea.
8 May 1985, received the Order of the Red Banner in honour of the 40th anniversary of Victory Day.
On 10 January 2000, was given its Battle Banner and the honorific "Zakarpattia"
14 soldiers were awarded orders Hero of the Soviet Union.
19 soldiers and sergeants were awarded the Order of Glory.
3 personnel were awarded state decorations for valour in the Russo-Ukrainian War, and so far 1 awarded the Gold Star Medal as a Hero of Ukraine.

References

 carpathia.gov.ua

Brigades of the Ukrainian Ground Forces
Military units and formations of the 2022 Russian invasion of Ukraine
Military units and formations established in 2013
Mountain infantry brigades
Military units and formations of Ukraine in the war in Donbas
Hungarian Revolution of 1956